Inishmaine Abbey is a former Augustinian monastery and National Monument located in County Mayo, Ireland.

Location

Inishmaine Abbey is located on the eastern shores of Lough Mask, southwest of Ballinrobe. It once stood on an island, but canal construction lowered the water level and it is now on a peninsula.

History
Inishmaine was an early monastic site, founded in the 7th century by St Corbmac.

It was refounded after 1223 and settled by Arroasian Augustinian nuns (possibly from Annaghdown Nunnery) and was dependent on Kilcreevanty.

Inishmaine Abbey was dissolved c. 1587. During the troubles of the 17th century the Abbey was burned down.

Building

All that remains is the 13th century church and 15th century gatehouse. A number of ashlar blocks in the nave and the lintelled north doorway may have come from an earlier structure. There are carved capitals on the chancel arch.

The twin east window is also decorated in mouldings of wild and imaginary animals.

References

Augustinian monasteries in the Republic of Ireland
Religion in County Mayo
Archaeological sites in County Mayo
National Monuments in County Mayo
Monasteries dissolved under the Irish Reformation